The 1960 Vanderbilt Commodores football team represented Vanderbilt University in the 1960 NCAA University Division football season. The Commodores were led by head coach Art Guepe in his eighth season and finished the season with a record of three wins and seven losses (3–7 overall, 0–7 in the SEC).

Schedule

References

Vanderbilt
Vanderbilt Commodores football seasons
Vanderbilt Commodores football